Patrick Brereton is an author and academic at Dublin City University. He studies and teaches film, including a particular focus on the treatment of environmental issues.

Selected works
Hollywood Utopia: Ecology in Contemporary American Cinema, Intellect Press (2004)    
 Continuum Guide to Media Education, Bloomsbury Academic (2005) 
Historical Dictionary of Irish Cinema (With Roderick Flynn), The Scarecrow Press (2007)

References

Academics of Dublin City University
Year of birth missing (living people)
Living people
Film people from Dublin (city)